Bentley Hite (December 26, 1900 – February 18, 1992) was an American attorney and politician. He represented his native Montgomery County and Radford in the Virginia House of Delegates, first from 1930 to 1932, after the death of Allen I. Harless, and then from 1948 to 1952.

References

External links 

1900 births
1992 deaths
Republican Party members of the Virginia House of Delegates
20th-century American politicians